Upper Holloway railway station is in Holloway, north London (N19). It is operated by London Overground, and the service is one train every 15 minutes in each direction except late evenings when it is half-hourly. The line is now electrified, and services are operated by 4 car Class 710 EMUs.

Connections
London Buses routes 17, 43, 263 and night routes N41 and N271 serve the station.

Design
Station facilities are basic with little at street level other than a few signs to indicate the presence of a station. Holloway Road passes over the line and steps and ramps for wheelchair users, buggies, bikes etc. on either side of the bridge lead directly down to the platforms. There are information points, CCTV cameras, information screens and loudspeakers. There are brick-built shelters on each platform and the station staff operate out of a small portable office.

Signs of the station's past remain. The building which used to be the ticket office can be seen beside the south entrance (for trains towards Gospel Oak). A footbridge over the track remains, though this is closed and the only way over the track is via Holloway Road. The platforms were originally built to accommodate longer trains; the unused sections of platform remain, but are closed and in a poor state of repair. The signal box at the end of the platform is still in use.

In summer 2008, the station was repainted and re-signed in London Overground colours, with the green-painted staircase railings (for example) of the former Silverlink franchise giving way to Overground orange.

The cause of the closures was in part related to their close proximity to Upper Holloway station.

The station is in Travelcard Zone 2.

Services
There is a 15-minute interval service in operations on both directions throughout the week (including Sundays). Replacement buses operated over the affected sections of line. Weekday trains resumed on 27 February 2017 and the work was completed and commissioned in December 2017.

References

External links

Railway stations in the London Borough of Islington
DfT Category E stations
Former Tottenham and Hampstead Junction Railway stations
Railway stations in Great Britain opened in 1868
Railway stations served by London Overground